Come Get It! is the debut album by Rick James and the Stone City Band. It was released in April 1978 via the Motown sub-label Gordy Records. The singles "You and I" and "Mary Jane" propelled Come Get It! to gold status.

Critical reception 
Rolling Stone, in a retrospective, praised "You and I", writing that "James unleashed his brash 'punk-funk' movement with this gloriously strutting single, which boasted a colossal synth-bass groove, James' boa-tossing vocal panache and double-entendres directed at his ex-wife."

Track listing 
All tracks composed and arranged by Rick James

Side A
 "Stone City Band, Hi!" – 3:30
 "You and I" – 8:04
 "Sexy Lady" – 3:52
 "Dream Maker" – 5:16

Side B
 "Be My Lady" – 4:48
 "Mary Jane" – 4:57
 "Hollywood" – 7:27
 "Stone City Band, Bye!" – 1:10

2014 digital remaster bonus track
 "You and I" (Extended M+M Mix) – 9:55

2014 Complete Motown Albums bonus tracks
 "You and I" (Extended M+M Mix) – 9:55
 "You and I" (Extended M+M Instrumental) – 9:13

Personnel 

Rick James – vocals, guitars, keyboards, synthesizers, bass
Levi Ruffin, Jr. - Keyboards
Billy Nunn – keyboards
Bobby Nunn – keyboards
Freddy Rapillo – guitar
Andy Rapillo – bass
Mike Caputy – drums
Randy and Mike Brecker – horns
Richard Shaw – bass
Lorenzo Shaw – drums
Flick, Berry, Steve Williams – horns
Levi Ruffin – background vocals
Jackie Ruffin – background vocals
Bobby Nunn – background vocals
Billy Nunn – background vocals
Sascha Meeks – background vocals
Richard Shaw – background vocals
Vanessa Brooks Nunn – background vocals
Joey Diggs – background vocals
Anthony Caesar – background vocals
Roger Brown – background vocals
Calvin Moore – background vocals
Bennie McCullough – background vocals
Chuck Madden, Shelly – engineers

Charts

Weekly charts

Year-end charts

Singles

Certifications

References

External links 
 Rick James-Come Get It! at Discogs

1978 debut albums
Gordy Records albums
Rick James albums
Albums produced by Rick James
Albums produced by Art Stewart